Jen Statsky (born November 19, 1985) is an American television writer and comedian known for her work on Hacks, The Good Place, Parks and Recreation, and Broad City. She won the Primetime Emmy Award for Outstanding Writing for a Comedy Series for Hacks with co-creators Lucia Aniello and Paul W. Downs in 2021.

Personal life
Jen Statsky was born November 19, 1985 in Milton, Massachusetts where she grew up before moving to New York City to study at New York University. She attended Tisch School of the Arts where she studied Film and Television. She is a Los Angeles Clippers fan. She is married to Travis "Tug" Helwig, the Emmy-winning writer formerly at Crooked Media.

Career

Early beginnings
In school, Statsky developed an interest in writing. When she graduated from NYU in 2008, she was working in a coffee shop as well as performing stand-up comedy. Statsky continued her writing career as an intern for Saturday Night Live, Late Night with Conan O'Brien and The Onion. She joined Twitter in 2009 and used it to write jokes, ultimately gaining a following over time. In 2011, while Statsky continued keeping her Twitter account active, A. D. Miles, the head writer of NBC's Late Night with Jimmy Fallon, messaged her, suggesting Statsky apply to a writing position that was available. She applied for the position and in March 2011 her manager confirmed Statsky was hired as a writer. Before using Twitter, Jen Statsky had applied to Late Night with Jimmy Fallon and did not get the job.

Television
Late Night with Jimmy Fallon was Statsky's first experience as a television writer. She later worked as a staff writer for Hello Ladies and has worked as a writer for Parks and Recreation, Broad City, Lady Dynamite, and The Good Place. In 2019, Statsky joined other WGA writers in firing their agents as part of the WGA's stand against the ATA and the practice of packaging. In 2021, she signed an overall deal with Universal Television.

Book
Statsky has made a written contribution to the book The McSweeney's Book of Politics and Musicals that was published in 2012. Statsky also wrote a contribution for the book Notes From the Bathroom Line: Humor, Art, and Low-Grade Panic From 150 Of The Funniest Women In Comedy.

Filmography

Awards and nominations

References

External links
 
 
 Jen Statsky at McSweeney's Internet Tendency

American women screenwriters
American television writers
American women television writers
American comedy writers
Living people
1985 births
Showrunners
21st-century American women